The  Psel (translit. Psel, Ps'ol, Pslo) is a river, a left tributary of the Dnieper, which  flows through Russia and Ukraine.

The river's right bank is high and steep, unlike the low, left bank. Its periods of freezing range from December until the end of February to the beginning of April.

Tributaries
The following rivers are tributaries to the river Psel (from source to mouth):

Left: Ilyok, Pena, Udava, Rybytsia, Sinna, Syrovatka, Ustya, Lehan, Vilshanka, Budylka, Bobrava, Borovenka, Vepryk, Bobryk, Tukh, Glinitsa, Bakai, Lyutenka, Hrun-Tashan, Hovtva, Rudka

Right: Sudzha, Porozok, Oleshnia, Sumka, Vorozhba, Mezhyrichka, Hrun, Rashevka, Vuzka, Vovnianka, Balakliyka, Khorol, Manzheliya, Omelnyk, Belichka, Bahachka, Sukhyi Kahamlyk

Settlements
Cities and towns located on the river are: Sumy, Ukraine, the administrative center of the Sumy Oblast; Oboyan, Kursk Oblast, Russia; and Hadyach, Poltava Oblast, Ukraine.

Russia
Belgorod Oblast
 Prokhorovsky District
 Prigorki, Verkhnyaya Olshanka, Srednyaya Olshanka, Bugrovka, Beregovoye Vtoroye, Prelestnoye, Andreyevka, Vasilyevka, Yudinka, Kostroma, Vesyoly
 Ivnyansky District
 Olkhovatka, Cherenovo, Peschanoye, Samarino
Kursk Oblast
 Oboyansky District
 Peresyp, Semyonovka, Shipy, Znobilovka Kamynino, Goryaynovo, Afanasyevo, Oboyan, Trubezh, Anakhino, Lunino, Turovka, Gremyachka, Kartamyshevo, Shmyrevo
 Belovsky District
 Kurochino, Kursk Oblast, Gochevo, Strigosly, Bobrava, Loshakovka, Korochka, Peschanoye, Sukhodol, Giryi, Belitsa, Kursk
 Sudzhansky District
 Spalnoye, Borki, Fanseyevka, Kurilovka, Guyevo, Gornal

Ukraine
 Sumy Oblast
 Krasnopillia Raion
 Zapsillya, Myropyllia, Velyka Rybytsya, Hrunivka
 Sumy Raion
 Bytytsya, Pushkarivka, Velika Chernechchyna, Zelenyi, Homyne, Sumy Rayon, Sumy, Barvinkove
 Lebedyn Raion
 Chervone, Nyzy, Patriotivka, Kerdylivshchyna, Staronove, Byshkin, Tokari, Kulyky, Kurgan, Chervlene, Prystailove, Bobrove, Kamyane
Poltava Oblast
 Hadiach Raion
 Plishyvets, Duchyntsi, Brovarki, Hadiach, Velbyvka, Mali Budyshcha, Sosnivka, Rashivka, Lysivka, Mlyny, Pereviz, Mala Obukhivka
 Myrhorod Raion
 Velyka Obukhivka, Panasivka, Savyntsi, Velyki Sorochintsy
 Shyshaky Raion
 Malyi Pereviz, Pokrovske, Baranivka, Velykyi Pereviz, Shyshaky, Yaresky, Nyzhni Yaresky
Velyka Bahachka Raion
Psilske, Velyka Bahachka, Harnokut, Luhove, Dzyubivshchyna, Krasnohorivka, Herusivka, Balakliya, Kolosivka, Ostapye, Zapsillya, Pidhirya
 Reshetylivka Raion
 Sukhorabivka 
 Hlobyne Raion 
 Popivka, Zamozhne, Manzheliya, Lamane 
 Kozelshchyna Raion
 Plavni, Prylipka, Kyselivka, Hovtva, Zahrebellya, Yurky, Nyzhnya Manuilivka, Pisky, Knyshivka
 Kremenchuk Raion
 , Zapsyllya, Omelnyk, Fedorenky, Kramarenky, Romanky, Onyshenky, Shcherbaky, Potoky, Pridnipryanske
Horishni Plavni
 Kuzmenky, Kyyashky,

Flora and fauna

The fauna on the riversides of the Psel includes hares, foxes, deer and wild boar, beavers. There are a great variety of birds, such as wild duck, gray heron. Along the riversides there are forest areas, are predominantly deciduous trees. There are also conifers on the sandy areas of the bank. There are also numerous meadows.

In the river there are about 50 species of fish such as crucian, bream, tench, roach, etc. There are also catfish, pike, perch.

References 

Rivers of Belgorod Oblast
Rivers of Kursk Oblast
Rivers of Poltava Oblast
Rivers of Sumy Oblast